The 1991 Welsh Cup Final saw Swansea City win the Welsh Cup for the tenth time, by beating Wrexham 2–0 at National Stadium in the 104th Welsh Cup Final.

This was Wrexham's second consecutive final, having lost 2–1 to English side Hereford United the previous season.

The win gave Swansea their second campaign in a European competition, in the 1991–92 European Cup Winners' Cup, in three years after their Welsh Cup triumph in 1989. This campaign was also Swansea's last foray into Europe until 2013.  This triumph was Swansea's last in the Welsh Cup.

Route to the final

Wrexham

Swansea City

Match

MATCH RULES
90 minutes.
30 minutes of extra-time if necessary.
Replay if scores still level.

References
Welsh Football Data Archive: Welsh Cup Final 1990/91

1991
Final
Swansea City A.F.C. matches
Welsh Cup Final 1991